The Republic of Botswana has an honours system comprising orders, decorations, and medals.  They are awarded to civilians, members of the defence force, the police, the prisons service, and teachers.

Orders

Botswana has the following orders:

 Presidential Order of Botswana (POB)
 Naledi ya Botswana (NYB) — for conspicuous service.		
 Cross of Gallantry (CG) — for gallantry.		
 Presidential Order of Honour (PH)	
 Presidential Order of Meritorious Service (PMS) — for meritorious service.

Botswana Defence Force

The Botswana Defence Force has the following decorations and medals:

 Conduct Valour Cross (CVC) (1979- ) — for conspicuous valour in action against an enemy.
 Defence Force Medal for Bravery (DFMB)  (1979- ) — for conspicuous heroism and courage (not in action against an enemy).
 Conduct Leadership Cross (CLC)  (1979- ) — for good, practical, operational leadership in the face of an enemy.
 Duty Code Order (DCO)  (1979- ) — for devotion to duty by administrative or technical staff.
 Military Service Medal (MSM)  (1979- ) — for sound operational conduct in the face of an enemy.
 Founder Officer Medal (FOM)  (1979- ) — for the original officers who were on the strength of the BDF when it was formed.
 Distinguished Service Medal (DSM)  (1979- ) — for 20 years service (officers).
 Long Service Order (LSO)  (1979- ) — for 15 years service (other ranks).

Botswana Police

The Botswana Police has the following decorations and medals:

 BP Medal for Conspicuous Bravery (CBM) — for conspicuous bravery.
 BP Distinguished Service Order (DOS) — for devotion to duty.
 BP Medal for Meritorious Service (BPM) — for especially meritorious service.
 BP Jubilee Service Medal (PJSM) — for 25 years service.
 BP Long Service & Good Conduct Medal	 — for long service.
 BP Centenary Medal — issued to senior officers to mark the centenary of the Botswana Police in 1985.

Botswana Prisons Service

The Botswana Prisons Service has the following decorations and medals:

 BPS Medal for Conspicuous Bravery (BMCB) — for conspicuous bravery.
 BPS Distinguished Service Order (BPDO) — for 30 years service.
 BPS Medal for Meritorious Service (MMS) — for especially meritorious service.
 BPS Jubilee Service Medal (BPJM) — for 25 years service.
 BPS Medal — for long service.

Teachers

Botswana awards the following decorations and medals to teachers:

 Botswana Teachers Meritorious Service Award
 Botswana Teachers Mid-Career Award
 Botswana Teachers Silver Jubilee Medal
 Botswana Teachers Long and Distinguished Service Award

References

Botswana and the Commonwealth of Nations
 
Botswana